is a 2017 Japanese science fantasy action film directed by Fumihiko Sori, starring Ryosuke Yamada, Tsubasa Honda and Dean Fujioka and based on the manga series of the same name by Hiromu Arakawa, covering the first four volumes of the original storyline. It was released in Japan by Warner Bros. Pictures on 1 December 2017. The theme song of the film, "Kimi no Soba ni Iru yo", is performed by Misia.

Plot 
In the country of Amestris, Edward Elric and his younger brother Alphonse live in the rural town of Resembool with their mother Trisha while self-learning alchemy at a young age. When the brothers commit the taboo act of Human Transmutation to resurrect Trisha after she dies of illness, it backfires and they face the consequences via the Law of Equivalent Exchange: Edward loses his left leg, while Alphonse is dragged into the Gate of Truth. Edward then sacrifices his right arm to save his brother's soul and bind it to a suit of armor via a blood seal, later replacing his missing limbs with "automail" prosthetics. Edward later receives an invitation by Colonel Roy Mustang to join the military so he can research a means of restoring Alphonse's body. After becoming a State Alchemist with the title "Fullmetal Alchemist", accompanied by their childhood friend and Automail mechanic Winry Rockbell, Edward begins his quest with Alphonse to find the legendary philosopher's stone which could repair their bodies.

Years later, Edward and Alphonse confront a cultist named Father Cornello, whom they believe is using a philosopher's stone to recruit the people of Liore. As Mustang arrives to personally handle the situation, Edward exposes Cornello while the stone is revealed to be a fake. After reaching East City and spending the night at the home of Major Maes Hughes and his pregnant wife, the brothers are provided with lodging when Major General Hakuro introduces them to Shou Tucker, a bio-alchemy authority who obtained his State Alchemist credentials by creating a talking chimera. As the brothers become fast friends with the man's young daughter Nina and their dog Alexander, Tucker suggests Edward to find Dr. Tim Marcoh as he created a philosopher's stone prior to going into hiding. Alphonse remains behind to be examined by Tucker, who causes Alphonse to question his existence, while Edward and Winry head to Marcoh's last known whereabouts.

Though Marcoh was murdered by Cornello's benefactor Lust as he and Winry find him, Edward acquires the man's notes and asks Hughes to decipher them while unknowingly alienating Alphonse to keep him safe. Hughes later makes a horrific discovery from his investigation and ends up being killed by Lust's associate Envy, who assumes Mustang's form to frame the colonel for the murder. Edward manages to escape being interrogated with help from Mustang's aide Lieutenant Riza Hawkeye, using what he could deduce from the notes to investigate the clandestine Fifth Laboratory. At the same time, after revealing the new talking chimera that he created from Nina and Alexander, Tucker forces Alphonse and Winry to accompany him to the Fifth Laboratory, where they find Edward as he verbally realizes that the Philosopher's Stone is created from humans.

Tucker confirms Edward's realization, justifying their respective actions of selfishly manipulating life before Lust kills him while revealing herself as a homunculus. After Lust cryptically hints of her group's reach in the government and an upcoming event that Edward has a vital role in, Hakuro reveals the Mannequin Soldier homunculi and gets killed when he prematurely activates them. Mustang has Riza and their men keep the Mannequin Soldiers from flooding out of the laboratory while he confronts Lust and Envy, killing the former while ripping her philosopher's stone core from her body. While Mustang gives Edward the stone so he can restore Alphonse, Edward instead uses it to appear before his brother's body and promises to find another way to restore him. Edward then returns to his reality to reaffirm Alphonse's existence to him. Sometime after, as Gluttony mourns Lust's death, Envy is revealed to have survived Mustang's attack but has been diminished to its true parasitic form as a result.

Cast

Production 

The film was originally planned to be produced in 2013 but because of low budget and also technology, it was delayed until it was officially announced for production in May 2016. According to the director's press conference in March 2017:

On adapting the source material, Fumihiko Sori said, "I want to create a style that follows the original manga as much as possible. The cast is entirely Japanese, but the cultural background is Europe. However, it's a style that doesn't represent a specific race or country." Regarding the faithfulness of the adaptation, which has characters of non-Japanese ethnicity, the director said, "There will never be a scene in which a character says something that would identify him/her as Japanese."

Sori told Oricon he has a deep affection for the story that tells the "truth of living," and said, "It is my dearest wish to turn this wonderful story into a film, and it is not an exaggeration to say that I am living for this reason." He added that he "wants to create a wonderful film that uses techniques that challenge Hollywood," and noted that nowadays Japanese filmmaking techniques have progressed greatly.

Principal photography took place in Italy. Shooting was spotted in Volterra (identified as Reole from 06:53 to 12:54) on the first week of June and some scenes continued filming in Japan from June and finished on 26 August 2016.

Japanese VFX company OXYBOT inc. provided the visual effects for the film. The first teaser visual was unveiled on 31 December 2016. The updated version with the 2017 New Year Greetings were unveiled on the following day with the text "Happy New Year". In February 2017, they unveiled the release date of 1 December, with the CG appearance of Alphonse

On 19 February 2018, the film released on Netflix as a Netflix Original Film. Notably, in the English-language dub voice actors Vic Mignogna, Aaron Dismuke, and Caitlin Glass reprised their roles as Edward Elric, Alphonse Elric, and Winry Rockbell respectively from the Funimation dub of the Fullmetal Alchemist anime series.

Reception 
The film received mostly mixed reviews. The review aggregator website Rotten Tomatoes reported that 28% of critics have given the film a positive review based on 18 reviews, with an average rating of 4.8/10. On Metacritic, which assigns and normalizes scores of critic reviews, the film has a weighted average score of 48 out of 100 based on 5 critics, indicating "mixed or average reviews".

Sequels 
In July 2017, Sori and Yamada said a sequel was in development. They were released on 20 May and 24 June respectively. They became available on Netflix on 20 August and 24 September respectively.

References

External links 
  
 

Fullmetal Alchemist
Films directed by Fumihiko Sori
2010s Japanese films
2010s fantasy adventure films
2010s historical fantasy films
2010s science fiction films
Warner Bros. films
Fictional governments
Films set in Europe
Films set in France
Films shot in France
Films set in Italy
Films shot in Italy
Films shot in Japan
Fiction about government
Japanese action films
Japanese adventure films
Japanese fantasy films
Japanese science fiction films
Live-action films based on manga
Parkour in film
Prosthetics in fiction
Japanese-language Netflix original films